Sadīd al-Mulk Thuʿbān ibn Muḥammad ibn Thuʿbān was the Fatimid governor of Aleppo between 27 July 1024 and 30 June 1025. Thu'ban was a Kutami Berber commander based in Cairo until he was assigned by Caliph az-Zahir (r. 1021–1036) to replace Thu'ban's brother, Sanad al-Dawla al-Hasan, as governor of Aleppo after al-Hasan died of illness. Thu'ban was given the title sadid al-mulk (the right to kingship). His rule over Aleppo was described as "unpopular" by historian Suhayl Zakkar.

In 1024 Salih ibn Mirdas, leader of the Banu Kilab, began attempts to wrest control of Aleppo. His forces sporadically clashed with Thu'ban's troops beginning in October 1024, and in 22 November, Salih himself besieged the city. After weeks of heavy clashes, Thu'ban was betrayed by Salim ibn Mustafad, the head of Aleppo's ahdath (urban militia), who opened Aleppo's Bab Qinnasrin gate to Salih. The latter entered Aleppo on 18 January 1025, prompting Thu'ban to barricade himself in the former palace of Aziz al-Dawla at the foot Aleppo's citadel. By 30 June, Salih's forces captured the palace and the citadel, and arrested Thu'ban. When Salih returned to Aleppo in September, he freed Thu'ban in return for a payment, but executed Mawsuf, the Fatimid commander of the citadel.

References

Bibliography

11th-century people from the Fatimid Caliphate
Fatimid governors of Aleppo
Kutama
11th-century Berber people